The 1990–91 Iowa State Cyclones men's basketball team represented Iowa State University during the 1990–91 NCAA Division I men's basketball season. The Cyclones were coached by Johnny Orr, who was in his 11th season. They played their home games at Hilton Coliseum in Ames, Iowa.

They finished the season 12–19, 6–8 in Big Eight play to finish in fifth place.   They lost to fourth-seeded Missouri in the 1991 Big Eight conference tournament quarterfinals.

Games were televised by ESPN, Raycom Sports, the Cyclone Television Network, the Hawkeye Television Network, KWWL and Prime Sports.

Previous season 
The previous season the Cyclones finished the season 10–18, 4–10 in Big Eight play to finish in sixth place.  They lost to Kansas in the 1990 Big Eight conference tournament quarterfinals.

Roster

Schedule and results 

|-
!colspan=6 style=""|Exhibition

|-
!colspan=6 style=""|Regular Season

|-

|-

|-

|-

|-

|-

|-

|-

|-

|-

|-

|-

|-

|-

|-

|-

|-

|-

|-
!colspan=6 style=""|Exhibition

|-
!colspan=6 style=""|Regular Season

|-

|-

|-

|-

|-

|-

|-

|-

|-

|-

|-
!colspan=6 style=""|Big Eight tournament
|-

Awards and honors 

All-Big Eight Selections

Victor Alexander (1st, AP, UPI) 
Doug Collins (HM, AP, UPI)

NBA Draft Pick

Victor Alexander - Golden State (1st Round, 17th Pick)

Academic All-Big Eight

Phil Kunz

Ralph Olsen Award

Victor Alexander

References 

Iowa State Cyclones men's basketball seasons
Iowa State
Iowa State Cyc
Iowa State Cyc